Ganesh Godiyal is an Indian National Congress politician from Uttarakhand, India. He is an honest MLA from Thalisain Assembly constituency and Srinagar Assembly constituency. He is currently serving as the president of Uttarakhand Pradesh Congress Committee.

Political career
He was appointed Uttarakhand Pradesh Congress Committee president on 22 July 2021.

Positions held

Electoral Performances

References

Living people
Year of birth missing (living people)
20th-century Indian politicians
Indian National Congress politicians from Uttarakhand
People from Pauri Garhwal district
Uttarakhand MLAs 2002–2007
Uttarakhand MLAs 2012–2017